Air Vice Marshal Muhammad Mafidur Rahman is a Bangladesh Air Force officer and Incumbent Chairman of Civil Aviation Authority, Bangladesh. Prior to this appointment, he was the air officer commanding at two important air bases namely BAF Base Bangabandhu, Kurmitola, Dhaka and BAF Base Zahurul Haque, Patenga, Chattogram.

Career 
The Air Vice Marshal was enrolled at the Bangladesh Air Force Academy in 1983 and was commissioned in 1985 from BAF Academy in General Duties (Pilot) branch. At Un peacekeeping mission, he served as Military Observer in Macedonia in 1998 and as Contingent Commander of Aviation Units in DR Congo in 2005 and 2012. By dint of his current appointment he is Board of Directors of Biman Bangladesh Airlines. He has been elected as vice-chairman of the 56th Conference of the Director General of Civil Aviation (DGCA) of Asia Pacific (APAC) region. In December 2022, the defence ministry has extended his service until December of 2023 for the sake of public interest.

Personal life 
He is married to married to Sharmin Sultana and father of twin daughters, Mayisha and Ramisa. His mother Amena Begum is a Ratnagarva Award winner. His one younger brother Rear Admiral Mohammad Musa is a senior naval officer.

References 

Bangladesh Air Force personnel
Bangladesh Air Force
1967 births
Living people